BatfXXX: Dark Night Parody is a 2010 pornographic film from Bluebird Films that parodies The Dark Knight. It was directed by Nicholas Steele. The film was initially titled Batfucks, but it was renamed on August 19, 2010, prior to its release. Some of the film's scenes were shot in London.

Cast

Paul Chaplin as The Jo-Kerr
Nick Manning as The Bat
Madelyn Marie as Katwoman
Krissy Lynn as Robina
Isis Love as Batchick
Anna Lovato as Gangster Lovato
Esteban Fuentes as Rooftop Thug 1
Craig Spivek as Rooftop Thug 2
Phoenix Marie as Telethon Hostess
Yurizan Beltran as Beauty Queen
Katie Kox as Security Guard
Jenny Hendrix as Cheerleader 1
Brynn Tyler as Cheerleader 2
Nika Noire as Female Clown Driver
Blake Rose as Pilot in Box
Kristina Rose as Stewardess in Box
Rio Lee as Captured Hero
Delta White as Gangster Girl 1
Cindy Behr as Gangster Girl 2
Jasmine Black as Gangster Girl 3
Stacey Saran as Gangster Girl 4
Kaia Kane as Gangster Waitress
Demetri as Gangster Guy 1
Ian Tate as Gangster Guy 2
Jeff as Gangster Guy 3
Tony Uttley as Gangster Guy 4
Alexa Nicole as Kitka
Mark Davis as Mayor
Pike Nelson as Commissioner Gordon
Mr. Pete as 2-Face
Jazy Berlin as Lead Dancer
Brooke Haven as Lap Dancer 2
Brooke Banner as Lap Dancer 3
Dylan Ryder as Lap Dancer 4
Mason Moore as Lap Dancer 5
Natalie Norton as Lap Dancer 6
Tommy Gunn as Customer 1
Aaron Wilcox as Customer 2
Will Powers as Customer 3
Danny Mountain as Customer 4
Jamey Janes as Blonde Angel
Andy San Dimas as Devil Girl
David Perry as Mob Boss Moret
Derrick Pierce as Mob Guard 1
Chris Johnson as Mob Guard 2
Carolyn Reese as Mob Girl 1
Bobbi Starr as Mob Girl 2
Danny Wylde as Punk Guy
Dani Jensen as Punk Girl
Tory Lane as Poisen Ivy

Awards and nominations

See also 
Bat Pussy
Batman XXX

References

External links 
 
 

2010s pornographic films
2010s English-language films
American pornographic films
Pornographic parody films
Parodies of Batman
Batman in other media
2010s American films
Unofficial Batman films